Bill Corso is a makeup artist.

He has worked on over 70 films since his start in 1986.

Oscars
All three were in the category of Best Makeup

77th Academy Awards – Lemony Snicket's A Series of Unfortunate Events (Shared with Valli O'Reilly) (won)
79th Academy Awards – Click (Nomination shared with Kazuhiro Tsuji) (Lost to Pan's Labyrinth)
87th Academy Awards – Foxcatcher (Nomination shared with Dennis Liddiard) (Lost to The Grand Budapest Hotel)

References

External links

Best Makeup Academy Award winners
Living people
Year of birth missing (living people)
American make-up artists
Place of birth missing (living people)
Emmy Award winners